WASP-19 is a magnitude 12.3 star located in the Vela constellation of the southern hemisphere. This star has been found to host a transiting hot Jupiter-type planet in tight orbit.

The WASP-19 is older than Sun, has fraction of heavy elements above solar abundance, and is rotating rapidly, being spun up by the tides raised by the giant planet on the close orbit.

Planetary system
In December 2009 SuperWASP project announced that a hot Jupiter type extrasolar planet, WASP-19b, was orbiting very close to this star and with the shortest orbital period so far detected.

In August 2022, this planetary system was included among 20 systems to be named by the third NameExoWorlds project.

See also
 List of extrasolar planets

References

G-type main-sequence stars
Vela (constellation)
Planetary systems with one confirmed planet
Planetary transit variables
J09534008-4539330
19